Savia was a Spanish alternative rock band formed in 2005 by Carlos Escobedo, the lead singer of Sôber,  with the help of Alberto Madrid, who was at that time drummer of the same band, but passed died in a car accident. Savia stayed active until year 2009.

History 
Carlos Escobedo's idea to form Savia started in 2004 on tour for Sôber's last album: Reddo. Because of Sôber's huge popularity at the time, Carlos Escobedo had the idea to form a new musical project and start over. The group formed in 2005 while Sôber was on hiatus. They decided to call themselves Savia, because, as Carlos Escobeda said in an interview, the definition says it all "that which gives energy".

Members 
 Carlos Escobedo - Lead Vocals / Guitar
 Jesús Pulido - Bass
 Manuel Reyes - Drums
 Manu Carrasco - Guitar

Discography 

 "Insensible" (2005)
 "Savia" (2006)
 "Fragile" (2008)

External links
Savia on LastFM

Spanish alternative metal musical groups
Musical groups established in 2005
Musical groups disestablished in 2009
Spanish alternative rock groups
Spanish heavy metal musical groups